Sharon Regional Health System is a for-profit health care service provider based in Sharon, Pennsylvania.  Its main hospital is located in Sharon; additionally, the health system operates schools of nursing and radiography; a comprehensive pain management center across the street from its main hospital; clinics in nearby Mercer, Greenville, Hermitage, and Brookfield, Ohio; and Sharon Regional Medical Park in Hermitage.

With nearly 1,800 employees, Sharon Regional is Mercer County's largest employer.

Related links
Sharon Regional Medical Center website

Healthcare in Pennsylvania
Hospital networks in the United States
Medical and health organizations based in Pennsylvania